In angiosperms, a hypanthium or floral cup is a structure where basal portions of the calyx, the corolla, and the stamens form a cup-shaped tube. It is sometimes called a floral tube, a term that is also used for corolla tube and calyx tube. It often contains the nectaries of the plant. It is present in many plant families, although varies in structural dimensions and appearance. This differentiation between the hypanthium in particular species is useful for identification. Some geometric forms are obconic shapes as in toyon, whereas some are saucer-shaped as in Mitella caulescens.

Its presence is diagnostic of many families, including the Rosaceae, Grossulariaceae, and Fabaceae. In some cases, it can be so deep, with such a narrow top, that the flower can appear to have an inferior ovary - the ovary is below the other attached floral parts. The hypanthium is known by different common names in differing species. In the eucalypts, it is referred to as the gum nut; in roses it is called the hip.

Variations in plant species

In myrtles the hypanthium can either surround the ovary loosely or tightly; in some cases it can be fused to the walls of the ovary. It can vary in length. The rims around the outside of the hypanthium contain the calyx lobes or free sepals, petals and either the stamen or multiple stamen that are attached at one or two points. 
The flowers of the family Rosaceae, or the rose family, always have some type of hypanthium or at least a floral cup from which the sepals, petals and stamens all arise, and which is lined with nectar-producing tissue known as nectaries. The nectar is a sugary substance that attracts birds and bees to the flower, who then take the pollen from the lining of the hypanthium and transfer it to the next flower they visit, usually a neighbouring plant.

The stamens borne on the hypanthium are the pollen-producing reproductive organs of the flower. The hypanthium helps in many ways with the reproduction and cross pollination pathways of most plants. It provides weather protection and a medium to sustain the lost pollen, increasing the probability of fertility and cross-pollination. The retained pollen can then attach to pollinators such as birds, bees, moths, beetles, bats, butterflies and other animals. Wind can act as an instigator for fertilisation. The hypanthium is also an adaptive feature for structural support. It helps the stem fuse with the flower, in turn strengthening the bond and overall stability and integrity.

References

Bibliography

Books

Websites

External links
 Hypanthium images on MorphBank, a biological image database

Plant morphology